The Northwest African Strategic Air Force (NASAF) was a sub-command of the Northwest African Air Forces (NAAF) which itself was a sub-command of the Mediterranean Air Command (MAC). These new Allied air force organizations were created at the Casablanca Conference in January 1943 to promote cooperation between the British Royal Air Force (RAF), the American United States Army Air Forces (USAAF), and their respective ground and naval forces in the North African and Mediterranean Theater of Operations (MTO). 

Effective February 18, 1943, the NASAF and other MAC commands existed until December 10, 1943 when MAC was disbanded and the Mediterranean Allied Air Forces (MAAF) were established. Major General Jimmy Doolittle was the commander of NASAF.  However, during at least one critical period of the Tunisia Campaign at the end of February, 1943, General Carl Spaatz, the commander of NAAF, placed most of the strategic bombers at the disposal of Air Marshal Sir Arthur Coningham, commander of the Northwest African Tactical Air Force.

Order of battle
The components of NASAF at the time of the Allied invasion of Sicily (Operation Husky) on July 10, 1943 are illustrated below.

The 2686th Medium Bombardment Wing (Provincial) was activated on June 6, 1943 at Sedrata, Algeria and disbanded on September 3, 1943 at Ariana, Tunisia. Although the 42nd Bombardment Wing (Medium) is sometimes used to refer to the wing during this period, the 42nd Wing was actually the successor of the 2686th Wing.

See also
 List of Royal Air Force commands

References

Citations

Bibliography

External links
310th Bombardment Group
321st Bombardment Group
 

Military units and formations of the Royal Air Force in World War II
Military units and formations of the United States Army Air Forces